The Glasgow Bridge spans the River Clyde in Glasgow linking the city centre to Laurieston, Tradeston and Gorbals.

The original bridge was completed in 1772, and was designed by William Mylne and built by civil engineer John Smeaton. Its seven-arch structure was honoured by Thomas Telford, the first president of the Institution of Civil Engineers, who replaced it in 1833 with a design built by John Gibb & Son for £34,000.   One of Telford's colleagues,  Charles Atherton, was the resident engineer for the Works.  It became the first in Glasgow to be lit by electricity. Between 1895 and 1899 it was replaced with the current wider bridge which incorporated Telford's stonework and expanded the arches to accommodate larger ships. The present structure is protected as a category B listed building.

Proposed bridge
The Glasgow Bridge was also the name of a proposed bridge. Designed by the Richard Rogers Partnership, it was to be a curved, ramped deck bridge, using a cable stayed compression arch to provide an additional route from Broomielaw to Tradeston. However, late in 2006 funding was withdrawn for this project. The Tradeston Bridge has since been built to serve this function.

References

Bridges in Glasgow
Bridges across the River Clyde
Category B listed buildings in Glasgow
Listed bridges in Scotland
Viaducts in Scotland
Gorbals